Oleg Moldovan (born 27 October 1966 in Chişinău) is a former sport shooter from Moldova. He won the silver medal at the 2000 Olympic Games in the 10 m Running Target event. He was beaten by Yang Ling of China by 0.1 of a point.

Moldovan was the Flagbearer for the Moldovan team at the 2004 Summer Olympics Opening Ceremony.

External links
 Moldovan's profile at ISSF NEWS

1966 births
Living people
Moldovan male sport shooters
Running target shooters
Olympic medalists in shooting
Medalists at the 2000 Summer Olympics
Olympic silver medalists for Moldova
Shooters at the 1988 Summer Olympics
Shooters at the 1996 Summer Olympics
Shooters at the 2000 Summer Olympics
Shooters at the 2004 Summer Olympics